Montjane is a surname. Notable people with the surname include:

 Bokang Montjane (born 1986), South African model and beauty pageant titleholder
 Kgothatso Montjane (born 1986), South African wheelchair tennis player